Águila Islet ("Eagle Islet") is the southernmost point of the American continent (including the islands, but not counting the South Sandwich Islands).

See also 
 Extreme points of the Antarctic
 List of Antarctic and sub-Antarctic islands
 List of extreme points of Chile

Uninhabited islands of Chile
Diego Ramírez Islands
Islands of Magallanes Region